Philip Solomon (born 23 July 1951, in Wolverhampton, England) is a  Spiritualist medium, author, broadcaster and paranormal researcher. Philip Solomon is UK-based and has appeared many times on television and radio in his role as a medium. He has also written thirty books on the paranormal world and other subjects for the popular market as well as being a former radio presenter for Wolverhampton City Radio 101.8 FM. He was also a freelancer for BBC Radio nationally and WM West Midlands and various other radio stations worldwide. He is also a feature columnist for Psychic World Newspaper and in the past the Wolverhampton Express & Star newspapers, Haunted magazine, Take A Break's Fate & Fortune magazine and Psychic News. He has worked with several well-known mediums such as Derek Acorah and all the other UK and United States renowned mediums and parapsychologists such as Dr Hans Holzer. In the past he has worked for organisations such as the BBC and continues to be a major fund-raiser for charitable organisations.

Personal life
Philip has been a fan of football club Wolverhampton Wanderers since the 1960s. His other favourite team is Celtic FC.

Bibliography
Ghosts of the Midlands and How To Detect Them, 1989
Ghosts, Legends and Psychic Snippets, 1990
Black Country Ways in Bygone Days, 1992
Dreamers Psychic Dictionary, 1993
Ghosts and Phantoms of Central England, 1998
Beyond Death, Conditions In The Afterlife, 2001 (co-written with Professor Hans Holzer)
Haunted Derby, 2007
Guided By The Light, The Autobiography of a Born Medium, 2008
Official Wolves Quiz Book, 2008
Official Aston Villa Quiz Book, 2008
The A-Z of Spiritualism, 2019

And many others

References

External links
Official site

1959 births
English spiritual mediums
Living people
People from Wolverhampton